Nehemiah 9 is the ninth chapter of the Book of Nehemiah in the Old Testament of the Christian Bible, or the 19th chapter of the book of Ezra-Nehemiah in the Hebrew Bible, which treats the book of Ezra and the book of Nehemiah as one book. Jewish tradition states that Ezra is the author of Ezra-Nehemiah as well as the Book of Chronicles, but modern scholars generally accept that a compiler from the 5th century BCE (the so-called "Chronicler") is the final author of these books. This chapter and the previous one focus mainly on Ezra; with this chapter recording Ezra's prayer of repentance for the sake of the people (parallel to Ezra 9–10).

Text
The original text of this chapter is in the Hebrew language. In English Bibles this chapter is divided into 38 verses, but only 37 verses in the Hebrew Bible, with verse 9:38 in English texts numbered as 10:1 in Hebrew texts.

Textual witnesses
Some early manuscripts containing the text of this chapter in Hebrew are of the Masoretic Text, which includes Codex Leningradensis (1008).

There is also a translation into Koine Greek known as the Septuagint, made in the last few centuries BCE. Extant ancient manuscripts of the Septuagint version include Codex Vaticanus (B; B; 4th century), Codex Sinaiticus (S; BHK: S; 4th century), and Codex Alexandrinus (A; A; 5th century).

A time of mourning (9:1–5a)
The Jewish community at this time determined to sincerely follow God and to become a holy people, so they gathered in a 'demonstration of mourning, confession and [praising] God'.

Verse 1
Now in the twenty and fourth day of this month the children of Israel were assembled with fasting, and with sackclothes, and earth upon them.
The month was Tishrei. The feast of tabernacles began on the fourteenth day of the month, and ended on the twenty-second, "all which time mourning had been forbidden, as contrary to the nature of the feast, which was to be kept with joy". Methodist commentator Joseph Benson reflects that "now, on the twenty-fourth, the next day but one after the feast, their consciences having been fully awakened, and their hearts filled with grief for their sins, which they were not allowed to express in that time of public joy, they resume their former thoughts, and, recalling their sins to mind, set apart a day for solemn fasting and humiliation". "Sackclothes" were made of "dark, coarse material associated with sorrow and repentance".

The prayer (9:5b–37)
This section records the prayer of praise and petition offered by the Levites on behalf of the people to appeal for the grace of God. With the Persians presumably listening, the mentioned historical events are certainly not arbitrarily selected, as the prayer is making some strong statements:
 (1) The land is given to the Jews by God, thus outside Persian authority
 (2) This Jewish claim is 'based on God's sanction, not Persia's'
 (3) The claim is prior to Persian claims.

Verse 29
And testified against them,
That You might bring them back to Your law.
Yet they acted proudly,
And did not heed Your commandments,
But sinned against Your judgments,
‘Which if a man does, he shall live by them.’
And they shrugged their shoulders,
Stiffened their necks,
And would not hear.
"Testified against them": or "admonished them."
"Proudly": or"presumptuously."
"If a man does": Hebrew: "if a man keep", NET Bible: "if he obeys them" (cf. Nehemiah 1:5).
"They shrugged their shoulders": Hebrew: "they gave a stubborn shoulder", NET Bible: "they boldly turned from you".
"Stiffened their necks": or "became stubborn", NET Bible: "rebelled".

The pledge of the people (9:38)
It is a tradition in the ancient Middle-East that a document (covenant, agreement) should always be authenticated by a seal or any number of seals. For example, Babylonian and Assyrian documents were often found ‘stamped with half a dozen seals or more’, which ‘were impressed upon the moist clay, and then the clay was baked’.

Verse 38
And because of all this we make a sure covenant, and write it; and our princes, Levites, and priests, seal unto it.
"And write it": Hebrew: "and writing", NET Bible: "in written form".

See also
Jerusalem
Manna
Ur of the Chaldees
Related Bible parts: Exodus 16, Exodus 17, Ezra 9, Ezra 10

Notes

References

Sources

Further reading
Blenkinsopp, Joseph, "Ezra-Nehemiah: A Commentary" (Eerdmans, 1988)
Blenkinsopp, Joseph, "Judaism, the first phase" (Eerdmans, 2009)
Coggins, R.J., "The Books of Ezra and Nehemiah" (Cambridge University Press, 1976)
Ecker, Ronald L., "Ezra and Nehemiah", Ecker's Biblical Web Pages, 2007.
Grabbe, L.L., "Ezra-Nehemiah" (Routledge, 1998)
Grabbe, L.L., "A history of the Jews and Judaism in the Second Temple Period, Volume 1" (T&T Clark, 2004)
Throntveit, Mark A. (1992) "Ezra-Nehemiah". John Knox Press

External links
 Jewish translations:
 Nechemiah - Nehemiah - Chapter 9 (Judaica Press) translation [with Rashi's commentary] at Chabad.org
 Christian translations:
 Online Bible at GospelHall.org (ESV, KJV, Darby, American Standard Version, Bible in Basic English)
 Book of Nehemiah Chapter 9. Bible Gateway

09